Michael Schey (born 29 August 1945 – found dead 30 April 2011), known professionally as Harry S. Morgan, was a German director and producer of pornographic movies. He is known for directing classic-style movies.

Biography
Morgan studied photography at the Folkwang University of the Arts in Essen. In 1991, he directed the thriller Pommes Rot-Weiß with Michael Lesch.

His first actions as a director and producer in the porn industry were in 1988. Morgan's trademarks are extreme sexual practices such as double penetration, fisting, and urination. He is well known as the journalist who interviews the actors before and after the scenes.

Morgan worked for the company Videorama producing series like Maximum Perversum, Teeny Exzesse, and Junge Debütantinnen, and he became especially known for films with Gina Wild and Vivian Schmitt. He lived in Düsseldorf.

Awards
 1997 Venus Award – Best Series Director (Germany)
 2001 Venus Award – Best Director (Germany)
 2004 Venus Award – Best Director (Germany)
 2007 Eroticline Award – Video Award for Outstanding Achievements (it was given back though)

References

External links

1945 births
2011 deaths
German male pornographic film actors
German pornographic film directors
German pornographic film producers
Actors from Essen
Film people from North Rhine-Westphalia